Alien Secrets is a children's science fiction novel by Annette Curtis Klause. It was first published in 1993. The book is in over 1400 libraries, according to WorldCat.

Story
The story revolves around a human female character named Puck. After being expelled from a boarding school on Earth, Puck is headed to an alien planet, which humans call Aurora, where her parents (who are xenoanthropologists hoping to study the native Shoowa) await her arrival. While aboard the spacecraft Cat's  Cradle she unexpectedly befriends an alien named Hush. Hush is desperately searching for a sacred artifact that has been stolen from him. The relic is of great importance; it is a valued item among his people. While aboard the spaceship, both Puck and Hush find themselves immersed in the mystery of lost objects and ghosts and murder.

Characters
 Puck (Robin Goodfellow) - A headstrong, opinionated 13-year-old human female. 
 Hush - A young male alien.

Awards
The book has won two awards:
1995 - Texas Bluebonnet Award
1994 - Maine Student Book Award

References

1993 American novels
1993 science fiction novels
American children's novels
American science fiction novels
Children's science fiction novels
1993 children's books